The Incredible Dr. Pol is an American reality television show on Nat Geo Wild that follows Dutch-American veterinarian Jan Pol and his family and employees at his practice in rural Weidman, Michigan. The series premiered October 29, 2011 and has two seasons every year.

Cast 

Jan Pol (born on 4 September 1942, in Wateren, Netherlands), studied veterinary medicine at Utrecht University, graduating in 1970. He and his wife moved to Harbor Beach, Michigan, where Pol worked for a veterinarian for more than 10 years. They then moved to Weidman, Michigan, where they opened their own practice, Pol Veterinary Services, out of their home in 1981.   The focus of Pol's practice has shifted from almost exclusively large animals to a combination of large and small ones.  Because of the unavailability of emergency care animal hospitals in this rural area, emergencies make up a large portion of the practice.  He claims to have served more than 19,000 clients in his many years of practice.  Pol has said that despite his advancing years, he cannot retire since there are no veterinarians stepping into the breach to take care of farm animals.
Diane Pol (born in Mayville, Michigan, in 6 February 1943), met Jan Pol when he was a foreign exchange student at Mayville High School in 1961. She has a master's degree in Special Reading and used to be a teacher at Harbor Beach Elementary School. Diane and Jan have been married for over 50 years.
Charles Pol (born in 06 March, graduated from the University of Miami in Florida, 2003) is producer.
Brenda Grettenberger (born in 23 February 1967, Eaton Rapids, Michigan) graduated from Michigan State University College of Veterinary Medicine in 1992.
Emily Thomas (born in April 3 1984 in Warner Robins, Georgia) graduated from University of Georgia College of Veterinary Medicine in 2010, is married and the mother of three children.  Emily left the practice (and the show) in 2019.  She relocated with her family to take a job in Virginia.
Nicole Arcy (born in 20 December 1993 in Dearborn, Michigan, graduated from the College of Veterinary Medicine of University of Missouri) 
 Ray Harp (2019-2021)
 Lisa Jones, born in 27 199? December, graduated in veterinary medicine from Cornell University
 Tater Pol, The Office cat

Production

Pol is surprised that the show became a hit "watched by everybody—all kinds of life, all ages, big family show, and I think this is what is so fantastic."  He credits his son Charles, who is the series producer, and who successfully pitched the series to National Geographic.  According to Pol, Charles counseled him, "Dad, do your work. That is interesting enough. Don't look at the camera, don't do anything for the camera." Pol continues. "... it's not scripted; it is real."

Reception

Pol's style has received a mixed reception by veterinarians, and in 2014, Pol was fined $500 and had his license put on probation by the Michigan Board of Veterinary Medicine for not wearing proper surgical attire during treatment of a Boston terrier. However, a year later, the sentencing was overturned by the Michigan Court of Appeals, which reversed and remanded, holding inter alia that there was no competent evidence that there was a breach of the standard of care and citing the fact that "the owners of the dog were happy with the care it has been given."

References

External links 
 
 Incredible Dr. Pol, Episode guide

2010s American reality television series
2011 American television series debuts
National Geographic (American TV channel) original programming
Television shows set in Michigan
2020s American reality television series